Antoine Berman (24 June 1942 – 22 November 1991) was a French translator, philosopher, historian and theorist of translation.

Life 
Antoine Berman was born in the small town of Argenton-sur-Creuse, near Limoges, to a Polish-Jewish father and a French-Yugoslav mother. After living in hiding during the Second World War, the family settled near Paris. Berman attended the Lycée Montmorency. Later he studied philosophy at the University of Paris, where he met his wife Isabelle. In 1968, they moved to Argentina where they remained for five years. On their return to Paris, Berman directed a research program and taught several seminars at the Collège international de philosophie (International College of Philosophy) in Paris, and published his major theoretical work, L'Epreuve de l'étranger (The Experience of the Foreign) in 1984. He died in 1991, at age 49, writing his last book in bed.

Work 
Antoine Berman's "trials of the foreign", which originates from German Romanticism (especially Friedrich Schleiermacher), tries to show the "deforming tendencies" inherent in the act of (literary) translation.

Berman's 'twelve deforming tendencies' in translation were:
Rationalisation
Clarification 
Expansion 
Ennoblement
Qualitative impoverishment
Quantitative impoverishment
The destruction of rhythms
The destruction of underlying networks of signification
The destruction of linguistic patternings
The destruction of vernacular network or their exoticisation
The destruction of expressions and idioms
The effacement of the superimposition of languages

Lawrence Venuti, an American translation theorist, has used Berman's concepts to write a genealogy of translation in an Anglo-American context to introduce the "foreignizing" strategy that is normatively suppressed in mainstream translation.

Influence
Berman was active in philosophical and literary circles, nevertheless he has been influential in translatology, especially in translation criticism. He claimed that there may be many different methods for translation criticism as there are many translation theories; therefore he entitled a model of his own as an analytical path, which can be modulated according to the specific objectives of each analyst and adapted to all standardized text types.

Books 
 Moi, le Suprême (translation of Augusto Roa Bastos' Yo, el supremo). Pierre Belfond, Le Livre De Poche, Buenos Aires, 1979
 L'épreuve de l'étranger: Culture et traduction dans l'Allemagne romantique: Herder, Goethe, Schlegel, Novalis, Humboldt, Schleiermacher, Hölderlin. Paris: Gallimard, 1984. Translated into English by Stefan Heyvaert as The Experience of the Foreign: Culture and Translation in Romantic Germany. Albany: SUNY Press, 1992
 Lettres à Fouad El-Etr sur le romantisme allemand. Paris: PUF, 1991
 Pour une critique des traductions: John Donne. Paris: Gallimard, 1995. Translated into English by Françoise Massardier-Kenney as Toward a Translation Criticism: John Donne. Kent, OH: Kent State University Press, 2009
 La traduction et la lettre, ou L'auberge du lointain. Paris: Seuil, 1999
 L'âge de la traduction. "La tâche du traducteur" de Walter Benjamin, un commentaire. Presses Universitaires de Vincennes, 2008. Translated into English by Chantal Wright as The Age of Translation. Abingdon: Routledge, 2018

References

Bibliography
 Berman, Antoine (1999). La Traduction-poésie. Edited by Martine Broda. Strasbourg: Presses Universitaires de Strasbourg.
 Nouss, Alexis (2001). Antoine Berman, aujourd'hui (Antoine Berman for our time). Montréal: Université McGill.
 Davreu, Robert. Antoine Berman, penseur de la traduction
 
 Farrokhi, Mahdi (2009). Les oeuvres complètes d’Antoine Berman. Étude bibliographique. (A full bibliography.) In Equivalences 36:1-2, pp. 183–197. https://www.persee.fr/doc/equiv_0751-9532_2009_num_36_1_1424

External links
 Books by Antoine Berman at Amazon.com

1942 births
1991 deaths
French people of Polish-Jewish descent
French people of Yugoslav descent
People from Indre
University of Paris alumni
French translation scholars
20th-century French translators
20th-century French male writers
French male non-fiction writers
20th-century French philosophers